Filip Wichman (born 30 January 1994) is a Polish footballer. Besides Poland, he has played in Japan.

Club career
Wichman joined Japanese side YSCC Yokohama in early 2017.

References

External links
 
 

 JLeague Profile

1994 births
Living people
Polish footballers
Polish expatriate footballers
Association football goalkeepers
Lechia Gdańsk players
Bałtyk Gdynia players
Gwarek Zabrze players
Odra Opole players
Gryf Wejherowo players
Raków Częstochowa players
YSCC Yokohama players
J3 League players
Polish expatriate sportspeople in Japan
Expatriate footballers in Japan
Sportspeople from Gdańsk
Gedania 1922 Gdańsk players